The Beaumont-Tyson Quarry District is a  historic district in Jefferson County, Missouri and St. Louis County, Missouri which was listed on the National Register of Historic Places in 1974.

It is denoted Missouri Archaeological Survey Number 23JE338 - Ranken Quarry.  It includes 20 contributing sites.

References

Quarries in the United States
Archaeological sites in Missouri
Historic districts on the National Register of Historic Places in Missouri
National Register of Historic Places in Jefferson County, Missouri
National Register of Historic Places in St. Louis County, Missouri